Charaxes bipunctatus, the two-spot blue charaxes, is a butterfly in the family Nymphalidae. It is found in Ivory Coast, Ghana, Nigeria, Cameroon, Gabon, the Republic of the Congo, the Democratic Republic of the Congo, the Central African Republic, Uganda, Sudan, Kenya and Tanzania. A local and uncommon butterfly.

Description
Ch. bipunctatus Rothsch. is another close ally of tiridates, distinguished chiefly by the very short, tooth- like tails of the hindwing. Both sexes above coloured and marked like those of tiridates ; the blue spots, however, in the male in part indistinct or absent and the marginal streaks of the hindwing thick, ochre-yellow and not interrupted. Ashanti to Aruwimi.
A full description is also given by Walter Rothschild and Karl Jordan, 1900 Novitates Zoologicae volume 7:287-524.  page 390 (for terms see Novitates Zoologicae volume 5:545-601 )
Differs from Charaxes tiridates and Charaxes numenes  in that there are only two hindwing postdiscal spots (in spaces 5 and 6) and in the continuous yellowish distal margin

Biology
The habitat consists of lowland evergreen forests and sub-montane forests at altitudes between 1,200 and 1,500 meters.

The larvae feed on Blighia unijugata.

Taxonomy
Charaxes tiridates group

The supposed clade members are:
Charaxes tiridates
Charaxes numenes similar to next
Charaxes bipunctatus similar to last
Charaxes violetta
Charaxes fuscus
Charaxes mixtus
Charaxes bubastis
Charaxes albimaculatus
Charaxes barnsi
Charaxes bohemani
Charaxes schoutedeni
Charaxes monteiri
Charaxes smaragdalis
Charaxes xiphares
Charaxes cithaeron
Charaxes nandina
Charaxes imperialis
Charaxes ameliae
Charaxes pythodoris
? Charaxes overlaeti
For a full list see Eric Vingerhoedt, 2013

Subspecies
C. b. bipunctatus (Ivory Coast, Ghana, western Nigeria)
C. b. ugandensis van Someren, 1972 (Cameroon, Gabon, Congo, Democratic Republic of the Congo, Central African Republic, western Uganda, western Kenya, southern Sudan, north-western Tanzania)

See also
Kakamega Forest

References

Victor Gurney Logan Van Someren, 1972 Revisional notes on African Charaxes (Lepidoptera: Nymphalidae). Part VIII. Bulletin of the British Museum (Natural History) (Entomology)215-264.

External links
Images of C. b. bipunctatus  Royal Museum for Central Africa (Albertine Rift Project)
Images of  C. b. ugandensis  Royal Museum for Central Africa (Albertine Rift Project)
C. b. ugandensis images at Consortium for the Barcode of Life
African Butterfly Database Range map via search

Butterflies described in 1894
bipunctatus
Butterflies of Africa